Abberley Clock Tower is a prominent, distinctive clock tower in Abberley, Worcestershire, England. Built by James Piers St Aubyn around 1883 for Abberley Hall it is now part of Abberley Hall School.  It is a Grade II* listed building and claimed to be visible from six counties.

References

Clock towers in the United Kingdom
Towers in Worcestershire
Grade II* listed buildings in Worcestershire
Individual clocks in England
Towers completed in 1883